Spontaneous human combustion (SHC) is the pseudoscientific concept of the combustion of a living (or recently deceased) human body without an apparent external source of ignition. In addition to reported cases, descriptions of the alleged phenomenon appear in literature, and both types have been observed to share common characteristics in terms of circumstances and the remains of the victim.

Scientific investigations have attempted to analyze reported instances of SHC and have resulted in hypotheses regarding potential causes and mechanisms, including victim behavior and habits, alcohol consumption, and proximity to potential sources of ignition, as well as the behavior of fires that consume melted fats. Natural explanations, as well as unverified natural phenomena, have been proposed to explain reports of SHC. Current scientific consensus is that purported cases of SHC involve overlooked external sources of ignition.

Overview 
"Spontaneous human combustion" refers to the death from a fire originating without an apparent external source of ignition; a belief that the fire starts within the body of the victim. This idea and the term "spontaneous human combustion" were both first proposed in 1746 by Paul Rolli, a Fellow of the Royal Society, in an article published in the Philosophical Transactions concerning the mysterious death of Countess Cornelia Zangheri Bandi. Writing in The British Medical Journal in 1938, coroner Gavin Thurston describes the phenomenon as having "apparently attracted the attention not only of the medical profession but of the laity one hundred years ago" (referring to a fictional account published in 1834 in the Frederick Marryat cycle). In his 1995 book Ablaze!, Larry E. Arnold, a director of ParaScience International, wrote that there had been about 200 cited reports of spontaneous human combustion worldwide over a period of around 300 years.

Characteristics 
The topic received coverage in the British Medical Journal in 1938. An article by L. A. Parry cited an 1823-published book Medical Jurisprudence, which stated that commonalities among recorded cases of spontaneous human combustion included the following characteristics:

Alcoholism is a common theme in early SHC literary references, in part because some Victorian era physicians and writers believed spontaneous human combustion was the result of alcoholism.

Scientific investigation 

An extensive two-year research project, involving thirty historical cases of alleged SHC, was conducted in 1984 by science investigator Joe Nickell and forensic analyst John F. Fischer. Their lengthy, two-part report was published in the journal of the International Association of Arson Investigators, as well as part of a book. Nickell has written frequently on the subject, appeared on television documentaries, conducted additional research, and lectured at the New York State Academy of Fire Science at Montour Falls, New York, as a guest instructor.

Nickell and Fischer's investigation, which looked at cases in the 18th, 19th and 20th centuries, showed that the burned bodies were close to plausible sources for the ignition: candles, lamps, fireplaces, and so on. Such sources were often omitted from published accounts of these incidents, presumably to deepen the aura of mystery surrounding an apparently "spontaneous" death. The investigations also found that there was a correlation between alleged SHC deaths and the victim's intoxication (or other forms of incapacitation) which could conceivably have caused them to be careless and unable to respond properly to an accident. Where the destruction of the body was not particularly extensive, a primary source of combustible fuel could plausibly have been the victim's clothing or a covering such as a blanket or comforter.

However, where the destruction was extensive, additional fuel sources were involved, such as chair stuffing, floor coverings, the flooring itself, and the like. The investigators described how such materials helped to retain melted fat, which caused more of the body to be burned and destroyed, yielding still more liquified fat, in a cyclic process known as the "wick effect" or the "candle effect".

According to Nickell and Fischer's investigation, nearby objects often remained undamaged because fire tends to burn upward, but burns laterally with some difficulty. The fires in question are relatively small, achieving considerable destruction by the wick effect, and relatively nearby objects may not be close enough to catch fire themselves (much as one can closely approach a modest campfire without burning). As with other mysteries, Nickell and Fischer cautioned against "single, simplistic explanation for all unusual burning deaths" but rather urged investigating "on an individual basis".

Neurologist Steven Novella has said that skepticism about spontaneous human combustion is now bleeding over into becoming popular skepticism about spontaneous combustion.

A 2002 study by Angi M. Christensen of the University of Tennessee cremated both healthy and osteoporotic samples of human bone and compared the resulting color changes and fragmentation. The study found that osteoporotic bone samples "consistently displayed more discoloration and a greater degree of fragmentation than healthy ones." The same study found that when human tissue is burned, the resulting flame produces a small amount of heat, indicating that fire is unlikely to spread from burning tissue.

Suggested explanations 
The scientific consensus is that incidents which might appear as spontaneous combustion did in fact have an external source of ignition, and that spontaneous human combustion without an external ignition source is extremely implausible. Pseudoscientific hypotheses have been presented which attempt to explain how SHC might occur without an external flame source. Benjamin Radford, science writer and deputy editor of the science magazine Skeptical Inquirer, casts doubt on the plausibility of spontaneous human combustion: "If SHC is a real phenomenon (and not the result of an elderly or infirm person being too close to a flame source), why doesn't it happen more often? There are 5 billion people in the world [ ⁠today in 2011⁠], and yet we don't see reports of people bursting into flame while walking down the street, attending football games, or sipping a coffee at a local Starbucks."

Natural explanations 
 Almost all postulated cases of SHC involve people with low mobility due to advanced age or obesity, along with poor health. Victims show a high likelihood of having died in their sleep, or of having been unable to move once they had caught fire.
 Smoking is often seen as the source of fire. Natural causes such as heart attacks may lead to the victim dying, subsequently dropping the cigarette, which after a period of smouldering can ignite the victim's clothes.
 The "wick effect" hypothesis suggests that a small external flame source, such as a burning cigarette, chars the clothing of the victim at a location, splitting the skin and releasing subcutaneous fat, which is in turn absorbed into the burned clothing, acting as a wick. This combustion can continue for as long as the fuel is available. This hypothesis has been successfully tested with pig tissue and is consistent with evidence recovered from cases of human combustion. The human body typically has enough stored energy in fat and other chemical stores to fully combust the body; even lean people have several pounds of fat in their tissues. This fat, once heated by the burning clothing, wicks into the clothing much as candle wax is drawn into a lit candle wick, providing the fuel needed to keep the wick burning. The protein in the body also burns, but provides less energy than fat, with the water in the body being the main impediment to combustion. However, slow combustion, lasting hours, gives the water time to evaporate slowly. In an enclosed area, such as a house, this moisture will recondense nearby, possibly on windows. Feet don't typically burn because they often have the least fat; hands also have little fat, but may burn if resting on the abdomen, which provides all of the necessary fat for combustion.
 Scalding can cause burn-like injuries, sometimes leading to death, without setting fire to clothing. Although not applicable in cases where the body is charred and burnt, this has been suggested as a cause in at least one claimed SHC-like event.
 Brian J. Ford has suggested that ketosis, possibly caused by alcoholism or low-carb dieting, produces acetone, which is highly flammable and could therefore lead to apparently spontaneous combustion.
 SHC can be confused with self-immolation as a form of suicide. In the West, self-immolation accounts for 1% of suicides, while Radford claims in developing countries the figure can be as high as 40%.
 Sometimes there are reasonable explanations for the deaths, but proponents ignore official autopsies and contradictory evidence in favor of anecdotal accounts and personal testimonies.
 Inhaling/digesting phosphorus in different forms can cause the forming of phosphine which can autoignite

Alternative theories 
 Larry E. Arnold in his 1995 book Ablaze! proposed a pseudoscientific new subatomic particle, which he called "pyrotron". Arnold also wrote that the flammability of a human body could be increased by certain circumstances, like increased alcohol in the blood. He further proposed that extreme stress could be the trigger that starts many combustions. This process may use no external oxygen to spread throughout the body, since it may not be an "oxidation-reduction" reaction; however, no reaction mechanism has been proposed. Researcher Joe Nickell has criticised Arnold's hypotheses as based on selective evidence and argument from ignorance.
 In his 1976 book Fire from Heaven, UK writer Michael Harrison suggests that SHC is connected to poltergeist activity because, he argues, "the force which activates the 'poltergeist' originates in, and is supplied by, a human being". Within the concluding summary, Harrison writes: "SHC, fatal or non-fatal, belongs to the extensive range of poltergeist phenomena."
 John Abrahamson suggested that ball lightning could account for spontaneous human combustion. "This is circumstantial only, but the charring of human limbs seen in a number of ball lightning cases are [sic] very suggestive that this mechanism may also have occurred where people have had limbs combusted," says Abrahamson.

Notable examples 

On 2 July 1951, Mary Reeser, a 67-year-old woman, was found burned to death in her house after her landlady realised that the house's doorknob was unusually warm. The landlady notified the police, and upon entering the home they found Reeser's remains completely burned into ash, with only one leg remaining. The chair she was sitting in was also destroyed. Reeser took sleeping pills and was also a smoker. Despite its proliferation in popular culture, the contemporary FBI investigation ruled out the possibility of SHC. A common theory was that she was smoking a cigarette after taking sleeping pills and then fell asleep while still holding the burning cigarette, which could have ignited her gown, ultimately leading to her death. Her daughter-in-law stated, "The cigarette dropped to her lap. Her fat was the fuel that kept her burning. The floor was cement, and the chair was by itself. There was nothing around her to burn".

Margaret Hogan, an 89-year-old widow who lived alone in a house on Prussia Street, Dublin, Ireland, was found burned almost to the point of complete destruction on 28 March 1970. Plastic flowers on a table in the centre of the room had been reduced to liquid and a television with a melted screen sat 12 feet from the armchair in which the ashen remains were found; otherwise, the surroundings were almost untouched. Her two feet, and both legs from below the knees, were undamaged. A small coal fire had been burning in the grate when a neighbour left the house the previous day; however, no connection between this fire and that in which Mrs. Hogan died could be found. An inquest, held on 3 April 1970, recorded death by burning, with the cause of the fire listed as "unknown".

Henry Thomas, a 73-year-old man, was found burned to death in the living room of his council house on the Rassau estate in Ebbw Vale, South Wales, in 1980. His entire body was incinerated, leaving only his skull and a portion of each leg below the knee. The feet and legs were still clothed in socks and trousers. Half of the chair in which he had been sitting was also destroyed. Police forensic officers decided that the incineration of Thomas was due to the wick effect.

In December 2010, the death of Michael Faherty, a 76-year-old man in County Galway, Ireland, was recorded as "spontaneous combustion" by the coroner. The doctor, Ciaran McLoughlin, made this statement at the inquiry into the death: "This fire was thoroughly investigated and I'm left with the conclusion that this fits into the category of spontaneous human combustion, for which there is no adequate explanation."

In this example from The Skeptic magazine, there were two children from the same family who were tragically burned to death in different places at the same time. The evidence showed that although the coincidence seemed strange, the children both loved to play with fire and had been "whipped" for this behavior in the past. Looking at all the evidence, the coroner and jury ruled that these were both accidental deaths.

In popular culture 
 In the novel Redburn by Herman Melville published in 1849, a sailor, Miguel Saveda, is consumed by "animal combustion" while in a drunken stupor on the return voyage from Liverpool to New York.
 In the novel Bleak House by Charles Dickens, the character Mr. Krook dies of spontaneous combustion at the end of Part X. Dickens researched the details of a number of contemporary accounts of spontaneous human combustion before writing that part of the novel and, after receiving criticism from a scientist friend suggesting he was perpetuating a "vulgar error", cites some of these cases in Part XI and again in the preface to the one-volume edition. The death of Mr. Krook has been described as "the most famous case in literature" of spontaneous human combustion.
 In the comic story "The Glenmutchkin Railway" by William Edmondstoune Aytoun, published in 1845 in  Blackwood's Magazine, one of the railway directors, Sir Polloxfen Tremens, is said to have died of spontaneous combustion.
 In the 1984 mockumentary This Is Spın̈al Tap, about the fictional heavy metal band Spinal Tap, two of the band's former drummers are said to have died in separate on-stage spontaneous human combustion incidents.
 In the episode "Confidence and Paranoia" of British science fiction series Red Dwarf, a character called the Mayor of Warsaw is said to have spontaneously exploded in the 16th century and briefly appears in a vision by an unconscious Lister (the main protagonist of the series) where he explodes in front of Rimmer (his hologram bunkmate).
 In the beginning of the 1998 video game Parasite Eve, an entire audience in Carnegie Hall spontaneously combusts (except for Aya Brea, the protagonist of the game) during an opera presentation as the main actress Melissa Pierce starts to sing.
 This phenomenon is mentioned in the TV series The X-Files.
 In the episode "Heart Break" of the second season of the American action police procedural television series NCIS, a case is investigated where the victim at first glance seems to have been killed by spontaneous human combustion.
 In episode "Duty Free Rome" of the second season of the TV series Picket Fences, the town's mayor is shown to have been killed by spontaneous combustion.
 The manga and anime series Fire Force (En'en no Shōbōtai) focuses on the main protagonists fighting humans who have this phenomenon.
 In the fourth episode of the first season of the English comedic drama series "Toast of London", Toast decides to finish his book by having the main character spontaneously combust. When bringing it to his literary agent, the laziness of his ending enrages her to the point of spontaneous combustion in front of Toast.
 The adult animated series South Park devoted a whole episode, titled "Spontaneous Combustion", to spontaneous human combustion.
In Kevin Wilson's short story "Blowing Up on the Spot" (from his collection Tunneling to the Center of the Earth), the protagonist's parents died from a "double spontaneous human combustion."
In the 2020 American black comedy horror film Spontaneous, high school students at Covington High begin to inexplicably explode.
In episode 12 of Now and Again, Michael investigates a church that uses spontaneous human combustion.

See also 

 Exploding animal
 Fan death
 Pyrokinesis

References

External links 
 Spontaneous Human Combustion:The Germany Incident
 Spontaneous Human Combustion: A Brief History
 New light on human torch mystery
 SHC: Reports in Chronological Order

 
Forteana
Human
Causes of death
Combustion
Unexplained phenomena
Paranormal